Joe M Stell, Jr. (June 15, 1928 - October 30, 2020) was an American politician who was a Democratic member of the New Mexico House of Representatives from 1984 to 2007. Stell attended Southern Methodist University, Western New Mexico University and the University of New Mexico. He is a former teacher, principal and rancher.

References

1928 births
2020 deaths
People from Carlsbad, New Mexico
People from Lynn County, Texas
Western New Mexico University alumni
Eastern New Mexico University alumni
New Mexico State University alumni
University of New Mexico alumni
Democratic Party members of the New Mexico House of Representatives